The 28th Saskatchewan Legislature was elected in the 2016 Saskatchewan election. It is controlled by the Saskatchewan Party first under Premier Brad Wall and later by Scott Moe.

Members

References

Terms of the Saskatchewan Legislature
2016 establishments in Saskatchewan
2016 in Saskatchewan
2017 in Saskatchewan
2018 in Saskatchewan
2019 in Saskatchewan
2020 in Saskatchewan
2016 in Canadian politics
2017 in Canadian politics
2018 in Canadian politics
2019 in Canadian politics
2020 in Canadian politics
2020 disestablishments in Saskatchewan